Shaun William Creighton (born 14 May 1967 in Sydney, New South Wales) is an Australian retired long-distance runner.

Achievements

Personal bests
1500 metres - 3:38.59 min (1993)
Mile run - 3:59.46 min (1995)
3000 metres - 7:41.60 min (1995)
3000 metres steeplechase - 8:16.22 min (1993)
5000 metres - 13:17.76 min (1995)
10,000 metres - 27:31.92 min (1996)
Half marathon - 1:03:34 min (1998)
Marathon - 2:10:22 min (1997)

References

External links

1967 births
Living people
Australian male long-distance runners
Australian male steeplechase runners
Athletes (track and field) at the 1990 Commonwealth Games
Athletes (track and field) at the 1994 Commonwealth Games
Athletes (track and field) at the 1998 Commonwealth Games
Athletes (track and field) at the 2002 Commonwealth Games
Athletes (track and field) at the 1996 Summer Olympics
Athletes (track and field) at the 2000 Summer Olympics
Olympic athletes of Australia
Athletes from Sydney
Australian Institute of Sport track and field athletes
Universiade medalists in athletics (track and field)
Universiade gold medalists for Australia
Medalists at the 1991 Summer Universiade
Commonwealth Games competitors for Australia
20th-century Australian people
21st-century Australian people